Each team must submit a final squad of 23 players for 2022 CONCACAF W Championship, three of whom must be goalkeepers, at least ten days before the opening match of the tournament. If a player becomes injured or ill severely enough to prevent their participation in the tournament before their team's first match, or following the completion of the group stage, they can be replaced by another player from the preliminary list. On 8 June, all the teams submitted their preliminary roster. The final rosters were announced on 29 June 2022.

The age listed for each player is their age as of 4 July 2022, the first day of the tournament. The numbers of caps and goals listed for each player do not include any matches played after the start of the tournament. The club listed is the club for which the player last played a competitive match prior to the tournament. The nationality for each club reflects the national association (not the league) to which the club is affiliated. A flag is included for coaches who are of a different nationality to their team.

Group A

Haiti
A 26-player training camp roster was announced on 17 June 2022. The final 23-player roster was released on 29 June 2022.

Head coach:  Nicolas Delépine

Jamaica
A provisional 26 player squad was announced on 14 June 2022. The final 24-player roster was released on 28 June 2022.

Head coach: Lorne Donaldson

Mexico
The 33 players were called up for training-camp, that was held on 13 June 2022. The 23 player roster was announced on 23 June.

Head coach: Mónica Vergara

United States
The 23 player roster was named on 13 June 2022. On 11 July 2022, Ashley Hatch withdrew due to an injury sustained in the group match against Jamaica and was replaced by Sam Coffey.

Head coach:  Vlatko Andonovski

Group B

Canada
The 23 player roster was named on 24 June 2022.

Head coach:  Bev Priestman

Costa Rica
The 23-player roster was announced on 29 June 2022.

Head coach: Amelia Valverde

Panama
The 23-player roster was announced on 26 June 2022.

Head coach:  Ignacio Quintana

Trinidad and Tobago
A 25-player travelling roster was announced on 21 June 2022. The final 23-player roster was announced on 1 July 2022.

Head coach: Kenwyne Jones

Player representation

By club
Clubs with 4 or more players represented are listed.

By club nationality

By club federation

By representatives of domestic league

References 

CONCACAF Women's Championship squads
Squads